Thak Lany is a Cambodian politician. She belongs to the Sam Rainsy Party and was elected to represent Kampong Cham Province in the National Assembly of Cambodia in 2003.

References

Members of the National Assembly (Cambodia)
Members of the Senate (Cambodia) 
Candlelight Party politicians
Living people
Year of birth missing (living people)